USS Flasher (SS-249) was a Gato-class submarine which served in the Pacific during World War II. She received the Presidential Unit Citation and six battle stars, and sank 21 ships for a total of 100,231 tons of Japanese shipping, making her one of the most successful American submarines of the War. She was the first ship of the United States Navy to be named for the flasher.

Construction and commissioning
Flasher′s keel was laid down 30 September 1942 by Electric Boat Company, Groton, Connecticut. She was launched on 20 June 1943, sponsored by Mrs. Eleanor Saunders — wife of Lieutenant Commander Willard Saunders, commanding officer of the submarine  — and commissioned 25 September 1943, Lieutenant Commander Reuben T. Whitaker in command.

First and second war patrols, January – May 1944 
Flasher arrived at Pearl Harbor from New London 15 December 1943 to prepare for her first war patrol, for which she sailed 6 January 1944. Bound for her patrol area off Mindoro, she sank her first target 18 January, sending a 2,900-ton former gunboat Yoshida Maru to the bottom. Adding to what would be the greatest total of enemy tonnage credited to an American submarine in World War II, she sank the freighter Taishin Maru(1,723 tons) off Manila 5 February, and sank two cargo ships of the same convoy on 14 February. Flasher arrived at Fremantle, Australia 29 February to refit.  The 2 vessels sunk 14 February 1944 were the Minryo Maru(1,679 tons) and the Hokuan Maru(3,712 tons). See . (The Hokuan Maru probably rammed and sunk the  9 September 1943.)

Action-bound once more, the submarine departed Fremantle 4 April 1944 for the coast of French Indochina on her second war patrol. On 29 April she contacted the French aviso Tahure guarding a freighter (Song Giang Maru, 1065 grt) off the Hon Doi Islands, and sank both. After sinking a large cargo ship (Teisen Maru) in the Sulu Sea 9 May, Flasher set course for Fremantle, arriving 28 May for refit until 19 June.

Third and fourth war patrols, June – October 1944 
Flasher made her third war patrol in the South China Sea, where on 28 June 1944 she contacted a heavily escorted convoy of 13 ships. She made a cautious approach, undeterred by the escort, and shortly after midnight 29 June, broke into the convoy to sink a freighter (Nippo Maru 6,079 tons) and badly damage a large passenger cargo ship. Her next victim was a freighter (Koto Maru 3,557 tons), sunk 7 July. Twelve days later, Flasher sighted cruiser Ōi escorted by a destroyer. Two attacks, each followed by a heavy depth charge retaliation from the destroyer, sufficed to sink the cruiser, a fact confirmed several hours later when a periscope observation revealed only the destroyer in sight. Seven days later, she sank another important target, a merchant tanker (Otoriyama Maru 5,280 tons), and the same day damaged another tanker (Tosan Maru) later sunk by one of her sisters. With all her torpedoes gone, Flasher put back for Fremantle, where she replenished and refitted between 7 August and 30 August.

Although she was on lifeguard station during the air attacks preliminary to the invasion of the Philippines during part of this patrol, Flasher sank three ships, a former light cruiser (Saigon Maru 5,350 tons) on 18 September, a transport and hospital ship(Ural Maru 6,374 tons) on 27 September, and a cargo ship (Taibin Maru 6,886 tons) on 4 October. She returned to Fremantle 20 October.

Fifth and sixth war patrols, November 1944 – April 1945 

Lieutenant Commander George W. Grider took command of Flasher on 31 October 1944.< Heading the same attack group, Flasher departed on her fifth war patrol 15 November 1944, bound for Cam Ranh Bay. On 4 December one of her companions reported a tanker convoy, and Flasher set a converging course. As she made her approach in a heavy downpour, a destroyer suddenly loomed up before her, and Flasher launched her first spread of torpedoes at this escort. The destroyer (Kishinami) was stopped by two hits, and began listing and smoking heavily. Flasher got a spread of torpedoes away at a tanker before she was forced deep by a second destroyer, which dropped 16 depth charges. Rising to periscope depth, Flasher located the tanker burning and covered by yet a third destroyer. Speedily reloading, she prepared to sink the destroyer and finish off the tanker, and though almost blinded by rainsqualls, she did so with a salvo of four torpedoes, two of which hit the destroyer (Iwanami), and two of which passed beneath her, as planned, to hit the tanker (Hakko Maru 10,022 tons). Once more, counter-attack forced Flasher down, and when she surfaced she found no trace of the two damaged destroyers. The tanker, blazing away, was still guarded by three escorts until abandoned at sunset, when Flasher sank her with one torpedo. The two destroyers, both found after the war to have been sunk, were Kishinami and Iwanami.

Flasher contacted another well-guarded tanker convoy on the morning of 21 December 1944, and she began a long chase, getting into position to attack from the unguarded shoreward side. In rapid succession, Flasher attacked and sank three of the tankers (Omurosan Maru 9,204 tons, Otowasan Maru 9,204 tons, and Arita Maru 10,238 tons), receiving no counter-attack since the enemy apparently believed he had stumbled into a minefield. One of these tankers was the largest Flasher sank during the war. The other two tankers had displacements similar to each other, were tied for third largest.

Refitting at Fremantle once more between 2 January and 29 January 1945, Flasher made her sixth war patrol on the coast of Indochina. Contacts were few, but on 21 February she sank a sea truck by surface gunfire, and 4 days later sank a cargo ship (Koho Maru 850 tons) with torpedoes. She completed her patrol upon her arrival at Pearl Harbor 3 April 1945, and sailed a few days later for a West Coast overhaul.

Post-war 

Bound for Guam on a seventh war patrol at the close of the war, Flasher was ordered back to New London, where she was decommissioned and placed in reserve 16 March 1946, Grider relinquishing command of her that month. She was attached to the Atlantic Reserve Fleet. On 1 June 1959 Flasher was struck from the Naval Vessel Register. She was sold for scrap on 1 June 1963.

Commemoration
Flasher′s conning tower was removed and placed on display as a memorial at the entrance to Nautilus Park, a Navy housing area in Groton, Connecticut.  It was then moved to the intersection of Thames Street and Bridge Street in Groton, where it is the centerpiece of a World War II memorial that honors the 52 U.S. submarines and their crews lost during the war.  Its upkeep was originally the responsibility of the Submarine Veterans of World War II organization and was then transferred to U. S. Submarine Veterans, Inc.

Awards 
Flasher received the Presidential Unit Citation for her brilliantly successful third, fourth, and fifth war patrols. For her six war patrols, each designated "Successful", she received six battle stars.

Footnotes

References

External links 

 navsource.org: USS Flasher
 Kill Record: USS Flasher

Gato-class submarines
World War II submarines of the United States
Ships built in Groton, Connecticut
1943 ships